"That Kiss" is the sixth single released by indie rock band The Courteeners, it is a non-album track. It was released on 6 October 2008 on a CD and two 7" singles reaching number 36 on the UK Singles Chart.

Track listing
 CD
 "That Kiss"
 "Jacket"

 7" (1)
 "That Kiss"
 "Saw This and FORT of You"

 7" (2)
 "That Kiss"
 "Car 31"

Chart performance
"That Kiss" was released on 6 October as a CD single along with two alternate 7"s. Despite not being an album release, the single managed to enter the UK Singles Chart at a peak of number 36, making it the band's fourth UK Top 40 entry.

References

2008 singles
The Courteeners songs
2008 songs
Song recordings produced by Stephen Street
Polydor Records singles
Songs written by Liam Fray